The campus of Bates College includes a  main area, in Lewiston, Maine, and which is maintained by Bates College. It also includes a  Bates-Morse Mountain Conservation Area, and an  Coastal Center fresh water habitat at Shortridge. The eastern campus is situated around Lake Andrews, where many residential halls are located. The earliest buildings of the college were directly designed by Boston architect Gridley J.F. Bryant, and subsequent buildings follow his overall architectural template. The quad of the campus connects academic buildings, athletics arenas, and residential halls. The overall architectural design of the college can be traced through the Colonial Revival architecture movement, and has distinctive neoclassical, Georgian, and Gothic features. Many buildings are named after prominent abolitionists, politicians, businessmen, alumni, and academics.

History 

Oren Burbank Cheney requested land and the sum of $15,000 from the Maine State Legislature to establish a college on what was then called "the finest piece of land in New England." The campus began to be created in 1854 with the development of Hathorn Hall, through the donation of Seth Hathorn, which was built on 20 acres of farmland purchased from A.R. Nash whose farm house ( now known as Nash House on College Street) was later acquired by the college and is now the campus' oldest building being constructed in 1849. The school was established as the Maine State Seminary.

Hathorn Hall originally housed all academic departments and the top floor was used for a residential space for teachers and some students. With a growing need for space Parker Hall was constructed in 1857 and housed all faculty and students. The campus ran parallel to Frye Street, an area that was part of an affluent residential district of Lewiston. English colonists settled in the Maine area by the 1630s, however much of the college's architecture was heavily influenced by the Victorian era. The college acquired nearby Mount David to build an observatory in the 1860s. A small gymnasium was built to house meetings and special sporting events in 1867. One year later as student body grew John Bertram Hall was constructed, originally called Lyman Nichols Hall after a founder of Lewiston, it was renamed to remember John Bertram, a sea captain and large donor to the college. In 1890, Hedge Hall was constructed and named after Dr. Isaiah H. Hedge, who was a donor to its construction. In 1894, Roger Williams Hall, named after Roger Williams, was built to house the early administration and Cobb Divinity School. The first two residential houses were built in 1902, Milliken House, named after alumnus Carl E. Miliken and Whittier House. That same year Coram Library was constructed, followed three years later with Rand Hall, named after Mathematics professor John Rand. The college purchased the official residence of the president of the college, Cheney House, later in the year.

Andrew Carnegie donated $50,000 in support of the construction to the science building, inspired by the philanthropic endeavors of fellow business magnate, Benjamin Bates. In 1914, workers form Quebec and Lewiston began to construct the college's chapel late renamed the Peter J. Gomes Chapel. Later that year Chase Hall was built to support a dining hall. In 1927, and the following year Gray Athletic Building was constructed followed by Alumni Gymnasium. Donors gave $150,000 to its construction and requested it be named after president Clifton Gray. Muskie Archives, named after Edmund Muskie in 1985, was originally completed in 1928 to serve as the women's gymnasium. Smith Hall was soon to follow in 1940, to house first year students. In the 1950s the campus witnessed rapid expansion with the construction of Pettergrew Hall, Page Hall, and Schaeffer Theatre.
In the 1960s the administration moved from Roger Williams into Lane Hall, made possible through the donation of George Lane who donated $650,000. Five years later, Dana Chemistry Hall was built and named after honorary alumnus Charles A. Dana. In 1967, Wentworth Adams hall was constructed to serve as a men's dormitory. 
Merrill Gymnasium was constructed in 1980 followed by the Olin Arts Center, six years later. The college's residential village was constructed in 1992, followed by Pettengill Hall in 1999. In April 2008, the college completed its dining complex named "The Commons" at a cost of approximately $24 million, designed by the Japanese architectural firm Sasaki Associates.  The complex is over 60,000 square feet, certified LEED Silver, and features occupancy sensors, anti-HCFC refrigerants, natural ventilation, heat islands, and five separate dining areas with almost 70% of the walls being glass paneling. The interior wood overlay features trees that were salvages from "an old Thomas Edison phonograph factory in Wisconsin."

Architecture

Neoclassical design 
Lane Hall, and Hathorn Hall are notable example of the college's neoclassical entrance design. As a college in New England, Bates was a part of the Colonial Revival architecture movement, and subsequently built its buildings in correspondence by including cornice embellished moldings, and multi-plane windows. White pillars, as a staple of neoclassical design, can be found as the entrance to many different buildings, including some residential dorms.

Georgian influence 
Numerous buildings on the campus possess mint-green colorization on their bell towers, building caps and tips. This architectural design can be traced back to 1753 with the construction of Independence Hall in Philadelphia, Pennsylvania. Many buildings are American Georgian buildings that were constructed with wood and clapboards, with their columns made of timber, that have been framed up, and turned on an over-sized lathe. The green caps on the buildings of Bates College, both architecturally and structurally, were designed after Independence Hall. Most notably, Bates shares many architectural features with Dartmouth College and the Baker-Berry Library possesses numerous design aspects that parallel Hathorn Hall. Hathorn Hall was originally built to serve as the college's sole academic building and library, but has since been converted to solely an academic building. Numerous buildings on campus are red brick buildings that are designed in the Georgian style, and feature red print doors, as well as darkened ridge sides. Gothic influence is seen in the academic buildings as they feature seals associated with the college's motto and historical endeavors.

Academic buildings 
Most of the academic buildings at Bates College are heavily modernized but several are restored versions of the original construction of the 1800s. There are currently 9 academic buildings that include: Carnegie Science (named after Andrew Carnegie), Dana Chemistry Hall (named after Charles A. Dana), Hathorn Hall (named after Seth Hathorn and Mary Hathorn), Hedge Hall (named after Dr. Isaiah H. Hedge), Olin Arts Center (named after the F. W. Olin Foundation), Pettigrew Hall (named after Charlotte N. Pettigrew), Pettengill Hall (named after Frederick B. "Pat" and Ursula P. Pettengill.), Roger Williams (named after Roger Williams), and Schaefer Theatre (named after Lavinia M. Schaeffer).

Hathorn Hall 

After being completed in 1856, it became the college's first building. It is named for Seth Hathorn and Mary Hathorn of Woolwich, whose donations held found the school. As Bates' oldest building, it is one of 21 Lewiston locations on the National Register of Historic Places. It is located at 3 Andrews Road, Lewiston, Maine and is 21,000 square feet.

It features a brick exterior, white corinthian columns, a weathervane, and a bell tower, and was constructed by Gridley J.F. Bryant. Originally entitled Maine State Seminary this building served both the man academic building and residential building of the college until Parker Hall was built. Seth Hathorn and Mary Hathorn of Woolwich, Maine, donated funds for the construction of the building. Jonathan Davis donated the bell in Hathorn's bell tower.

Nineteenth century ivy stones from early classes at the college are embedded in the brick along the exterior of the building. Hathorn Hall's interior has changed several times since its original construction. A fire started in the bell tower of Hathorn Hall in 1881 which severely damaged much of the interior of the building, and the interior was again renovated in 1898, 1960–62, and 1984 (with $180,000 from the Pew Foundation). As of 2016, Hathorn Hall is home to Bates' mathematics and English departments and two computer labs.

Museum of Art 

Founded in 1955, the Bates College Museum of Art (MoA) holds contemporary and historic pieces. The entire space is split into three components, the larger Upper Gallery, smaller Lower Gallery, and the Synergy Gallery which is primarily used for student exhibits and research. Almost 20,000 visitors are attracted to the MoA annually.

Dorms 
The campus provides 9 residential halls that include: Parker Hall (named after Thomas Parker), Smith Hall (named after alumnus Dr. George Carroll Smith), Page Hall (named after May R. Page), Bertram Hall (named after John Bertram), Rand Hall (named after Prof. John H. Rand, Class of 1867), Adams Hall (named after Wentworth Adams), and 280 Hall (named after 280 Campus Avenue St.). As of 2016, two new residential dorms are being constructed, the first being Kalperis Hall, and the second being Chu Hall (named after Michael Chu). Named originally after the streets they are located on, they became operational at the start of the 2017 academic year.

Parker Hall 

After being completed in 1857, it became the college's second building, and oldest residential building. It was designed by Gridley J.F. Bryant. Parker Hall was named after Thomas Parker, a large donor to the construction of the building, and prominent Judge. The dorm was renovated in 1924, and then again in 1967. It was split into two sides with the men on the north side and the women on the south. It is currently 37,000 square feet and located at 1 Andrews Road, Lewiston, Maine. Parker is situated directly in front of the Historic Quad of Bates College and directly lateral to Hathorn Hall.

The dorm serves as housing for all academic years, and includes numerous common rooms and club rooms. Robert F. Kennedy stayed in Parker during his time at Bates College through the V-12 Navy Program. At one time there was a baseball cage, used for indoor practices, housed in the basement.

Lake Andrews 
Lake Andrews is named after Delbert Andrews, of the Bates Class of 1910, who served as college bursar and helped students dam a swamp to create a skating pond.  In 1998 the Lake's shoreline and drainage was fixed with a donation from Jack Keigwin, Class of 1959.

The Village 
There is one residential village consisting of three buildings each with four floors on the campus of Bates College. These include: Moody, Rzasa, and Hopkins (named after Arthur P. Hopkins.) The Village was built in 1992.

Campus Houses 
The first two residential houses were built in 1902, as Milliken House and Whittier House. Bates College provides 33 Colonial and Victorian Houses, that are spread near the campus and through the greater area of Lewiston, Maine. The 33 houses include: 10 Frye Street, Class House, Chase House, Cheney House, Davis House, Frye House, Hacker House, Frye Street Union, Hayes House, Herrick House, Holmes House, Howard House, Leadbetter House, Milliken House, Mitchel House, Molten House, Nash House, Parsons House, Pierce House, Small House, Stillman House, Turner House, Webb House, and Whittier House.

Libraries 
Bates College maintains two official libraries and house books, texts and artworks in various other buildings such as Hathorn Hall and Pettengill Hall. The two official libraries are Coram Library and Ladd Library. The Library system at Bates loosely includes the Edmund S. Muskie Archives and Special Collections, which house vintage papers, and publications of the college. It was named after Bates alumnus, and U.S Secretary of State, Edmund Muskie.

Coram Library 

Coram opened in 1902 and was fully utilized as the main library until 1972, when Ladd Library opened. In 1948, Coram was renovated and the library offices were transferred to Roger Williams Hall. Through the renovation the books and publications were stored in nearby barns and around the walls of the indoor track. A year later the renovation was completed and the library was, at the time, “the most modern library east of Boston.” The library basement houses almost 200,000 volumes of articles, subscriptions and audio/video items.

Ladd Library 

Officially known as the George and Helen Ladd Library, it is more commonly known as Ladd Library or simply, "Ladd." The George and Helen Ladd Library houses 620,000 catalogued volumes, 2,500 serial subscriptions and 27,000 audio/video items.

The first three floors of Ladd opened in 1973. The library was designed by the Architects Collaborative of Cambridge, Massachusetts. The overall cost was $3.5 million and was partially funded with a $500,000 challenge grant from the Kresge Foundation.

The library was dedicated on September 9, 1979 and named for George and Helen Ladd. George Ladd was a college trustee from 1957 to 1977. A stock basement was added at a cost of  $650,000 in 1982. The completion of this renovation allowed for a periodical collection and the audio department to move to the basement and the special collections department to move to the second floor. Modernizing measures in the late 1990s cost approximately $1.3 million.

Peter J. Gomes Chapel 
Located at 275 College Street, Lewiston, Maine, the Peter J. Gomes Chapel is the multi-faith chapel of Bates College. The chapel was built in 1913, and was heavily influenced by the Gothic construction that came from the King's College Chapel of University of Cambridge, which was built in the fifteenth century by Henry Vl of England. The stained glass windows that line the nave contain mostly secular figures whose scholarly and artistic endeavors have contributed to society and culture.

Other campus buildings

References 

Bates College
Bates College